Visitors to Brazil must obtain a visa from one of the Brazilian diplomatic missions, unless they come from one of the visa-exempt countries.

Visa policy map

Visa exemption
Holders of ordinary passports of the following jurisdictions do not need a visa to visit Brazil for up to 90 days (unless otherwise noted). Nationals of most South American countries may use a passport or an identity card.
 

Visits with the visa exemption are limited to the same purposes as those with a visit visa (tourism, business, transit, artistic and sport activities, without payment from Brazilian sources).

Nationals of Spain are specifically required to hold a ticket for entering and leaving Brazil, proof of accommodation or a notarized invitation letter, and proof of funds of at least R$170 per day.

Visas are not required for airport transit, from any nationality, as long as the traveler does not leave the international transit area.

Brazilian citizens who also have another nationality are allowed to enter and leave Brazil with the passport of the other country in combination with a Brazilian identity card. If they do not provide this Brazilian document, they may still enter Brazil as foreigners, subject to the regular requirements and limitations as such. However, usually this case is only possible if Brazil does not require a visa from the other nationality. Brazil only issues visas to dual citizens in exceptional circumstances, such as for those who work in foreign government jobs that prohibit the use of a Brazilian passport.

Diplomatic, official and service passports

Holders of diplomatic, official or service passports of countries exempt from visit visas (listed above) do not need a visa, except those of Andorra, Liechtenstein, Monaco and New Zealand.

In addition, holders of diplomatic, official or service passports of Algeria, Angola, Azerbaijan, Bahrain, Bangladesh, Benin, Burkina Faso, Burundi, Cambodia, Cameroon, Cape Verde, China, Congo, East Timor, Egypt, Equatorial Guinea, Ethiopia, Gabon, Ghana, Guinea, Guinea-Bissau, Haiti, India, Ivory Coast, Jordan, Kenya, Kyrgyzstan, Laos, Lebanon, Malawi, Mali, Mauritania, Mozambique, Myanmar, Nepal, Nigeria, Oman, Saint Lucia, São Tomé and Príncipe, Senegal, Sri Lanka, Sudan, Tanzania, Togo, Vietnam and Zambia and of diplomatic passports of Cuba, Iran, Pakistan and Uzbekistan do not need a visa.

Future changes
Brazil has signed visa waiver agreements with the following countries, but they are pending ratification or implementation:

 – amendment of existing agreement for holders of ordinary passports, redefining the maximum visa-free stay as 90 days in a 180-day period
 – for holders of diplomatic, official or service passports, up to 90 days, or the entire period of a mission if accredited to Brazil

The Mexican government decided to suspend its visa waiver agreement with Brazil from 11 December 2021, requiring a visa or electronic authorization for nationals of Brazil to travel to Mexico. The Brazilian government announced that it would consider a reciprocal requirement for nationals of Mexico to travel to Brazil. On 18 August 2022, Mexico discontinued the issuance of electronic authorizations for nationals of Brazil, requiring a regular visa.

In March 2023, the Brazilian government announced its decision to resume the electronic visa requirement for nationals of Australia, Canada, Japan and the United States from 1 October 2023, to restore reciprocity.

Visa types and requirements

Visit visa
The visit visa (VIVIS) allows stays of up to 90 days, for the following purposes:
Tourism, including cultural and recreational activities, family visits, attending conferences, volunteer work, research, study and teaching;
Business, including meetings, events, reporting, filming, surveying, signing contracts, audits, consulting, airplane and ship crew;
Transit;
Artistic and sport activities.

Holders of visit visas are not allowed to receive payment from Brazilian sources for the activities during their stay, except for daily allowances for living expenses, payments for entertainment performances, compensation for management of their own business, reimbursement of travel expenses, and competition prizes.

The visit visa is usually valid for multiple entries during the visa validity period, which is generally one year but may be longer for some nationalities. Each stay is initially limited to 90 days, but an extension may be requested from the Federal Police after arrival. The combined stays must not exceed 180 days per any one-year period.

Temporary visa
Many types of temporary visas (VITEM) are available, for stays longer than 90 days. Certain types of visas allow employment in Brazil. For some visas based on work or investment, the applicant must obtain authorization from the General Coordination of Immigration (CGIG) before requesting the visa.

All holders of temporary visas intending to stay for more than 90 days are required to register with the Federal Police within 90 days after arrival. After registration, they receive a national migration registration card (CRNM) and are granted residency for a certain period. In some cases this period may be "indeterminate" (permanent residency). Temporary residents may later apply to renew their residency period or convert it to permanent residency in some cases. Only the time spent as a permanent resident qualifies for naturalization.

In addition to registration, a taxpayer number (CPF) is required for various transactions, and a work card (CTPS) is required for those who will be employed in Brazil. These documents may be obtained in digital format online, free of charge.

Humanitarian
VITEM III is a humanitarian visa granted to nationals or stateless residents of countries experiencing serious instability, armed conflict, disaster or violations of human rights. Brazil has designated Afghanistan, Haiti, Syria and Ukraine for this type of visa. Residency is granted initially for two years, after which the applicant may request permanent residency.

Working holiday
VITEM VI is a working holiday visa, whose primary purpose must be tourism but paid work is also allowed. This visa is available only by international agreement with the country of nationality. Such agreements are in effect with Australia, France, Germany and New Zealand. These agreements require that the applicant be between 18 and 30 years of age, and allow a stay of up to one year.

Investment
VITEM IX is available for three types of investment. One type is for managers and executives whose companies invest at least 600,000 BRL in a Brazilian company, or at least 150,000 BRL and also generate at least 10 new jobs within two years. Another type is for applicants who personally invest at least 500,000 BRL in a Brazilian company, or at least 150,000 BRL in research activities. In both cases, the applicant is granted permanent residency from the start.

The other type of investment requires the personal purchase of urban real estate, for at least 700,000 BRL if located in the North or Northeast region, or at least 1 million BRL if located in another region. In this case, residency is granted initially for four years, after which the applicant may request permanent residency.

Family reunification
VITEM XI is available for spouses, domestic partners, children, grandchildren, parents, grandparents and dependent siblings of a Brazilian citizen, or of a person holding or applying for Brazilian residency not also based on family reunification, and for legal guardians of a Brazilian citizen. For this visa, residency is granted initially for the same period as the family member. Applicants may request permanent residency when the family member acquires it or after four years of residency.

International agreement
VITEM XIII is available for nationals of countries with residency agreements. Agreements providing permanent residency from the start are in effect with Argentina and Uruguay. A Mercosur agreement is also in effect with Bolivia, Chile, Colombia, Ecuador, Paraguay and Peru, providing residency initially for two years, after which the applicant may request permanent residency.

Retirement or digital nomad
VITEM XIV is available for retirees and beneficiaries of survivor pensions who have a monthly income of at least 2,000 USD and can transfer it to Brazil. Residency is granted initially for two years, after which the applicant may request permanent residency.

VITEM XIV is also available for digital nomads, who work remotely for a foreign employer using telecommunications technology, with a monthly income of at least 1,500 USD from a foreign payer or bank funds of at least 18,000 USD. Residency is granted for one year and may be renewed.

Medical training
VITEM XV (VICAM) is available for medical doctors licensed in countries with more than 1.8 doctors per 1,000 people. They are assigned to work in locations with low numbers of doctors in Brazil. The visa allows a stay of up to three years, renewable for three more years.

Requests for residency while already in Brazil
Requests for residency with the same purposes and conditions as temporary visas (except VITEM XII and XV) may also be made while the individual is already in Brazil, having entered with a certain visa or waiver but later qualifying for a different or more desirable category. In addition, individuals in various circumstances may also request residency while already in Brazil:
Former Brazilian nationals
Refugees, asylum seekers and stateless people
Unaccompanied minors
Victims of human trafficking, slavery or other criminal abuses of migrants
Individuals serving a criminal sentence or probation in Brazil
Nationals of neighboring countries that have not ratified the Mercosur residency agreement (Guyana, Suriname and Venezuela)
Nationals of Cuba who have participated in the Mais Médicos medical training program
Nationals of the Dominican Republic and Senegal who have an application for refugee status under review (requires withdrawing the application)

Diplomatic, official and courtesy visas
Brazil issues diplomatic visas (VIDIP) to representatives of foreign governments or international organizations, as well as official visas (VISOF) to their staff. It also issues courtesy visas (VICOR) to notable people for unofficial trips, to family members and domestic workers of holders of diplomatic or official visas, and to artists and athletes for free cultural events.

Accepted travel documents
For issuing visit and temporary visas, Brazil accepts passports of all entities that have diplomatic relations with it (all member states and observer states of the United Nations, and the Order of Malta), as well as Kosovo and Taiwan. If the applicant does not hold any of these passports, the visa is issued on a laissez-passer.

For issuing diplomatic and official visas, Brazil only accepts passports of entities that have diplomatic relations with it.

Visitor statistics
Most visitors arriving in Brazil for tourism purposes were from the following countries of nationality:

See also

Visa requirements for Brazilian citizens

Notes

References

Brazil
Foreign relations of Brazil
Brazilian immigration law